Zambian cuisine is largely based on nshima, which is a food prepared from pounded white maize. Nshima is part of nearly every Zambian meal. In addition to nshima, Zambian cuisine includes various types of stew, cooked vegetables and different types of beer. Dried fish and insects are also eaten.

About

Food 
Zambia's staple food is maize. Nshima makes up the main component of Zambian meals and is made from pounded white maize. It is served with "relish", stew and vegetables and eaten by hand (preferably the right hand). Nshima is eaten during lunch and dinner. Nshima may be made at home, at food stalls and at restaurants. In traditional communities, the making of nshima is a long process, which includes drying the maize, sorting the kernels, pounding it and then finally cooking it.

The types of relish eaten with nshima can be very simple, such as chibwabwa, or pumpkin leaves. Other names for the relish are katapa, kalembulaand tente. A unique way to create relish relies on cooking with chidulo and kutendela. Chidulo is used in dishes made with green, leafy vegetables and also for wild mushrooms. The chidulo is made of burnt, dry banana leaves, bean stalks or maize stalks and leaves. The ashes are then collected, added to water and strained. The resulting liquid tastes like vinegar. Kutendela is a prepared peanut powder made of pounded raw peanuts and is added to the chidulo sauce.

Ifisashi is another common food in Zambia. It is a type of stew, made with greens and peanuts and served with nshima. Ifisashi can be vegetarian or cooked meat can be added to the stew. Samp is also eaten in Zambia.

Kapenta, a small sardine from Lake Tanganyika, has been introduced in lakes in Zambia. The fish is caught and dried to be cooked later, or it can be cooked fresh. Gizzards are also a popular delicacy in Zambia.

Various insects are also eaten. These include stink bugs and mopani worms.

Alcohol 
In Zambia, traditional beer is made from maize. Individual villages once brewed their own recipes and it was shared communally. Maize beer is also brewed commercially in Lusaka, with Chibuku and Shake-Shake being popular brands. Other types of beer that are popular include Mosi and Rhino. The first Zambian beer festival was held on September 25, 2009, at the Barclays Sports Complex in Lusaka.

History 

The use of maize in dishes such as nsima or nshima happened during the latter half of the 20th century.

The Bemba people, who live in what is now Zambia, traditionally ate what was available depending on weather patterns. Bemba meals included a type of thick porridge made of millet called ubwali which was eaten with "relish" called umunani. Ubwali was eaten with nearly every meal. Umunani was most often a type of stew made with meat, fish, insects or vegetables. The Bemba preferred to eat ubwali with only one type of relish at a time. The stews made with meat and vegetables were cooked with salt and sometimes ground-nuts. Generally, the Bemba did not eat raw food. Overall, Bemba cooking was fairly plain in taste and only occasionally acidic or spicy. Beer was an important part of social events for the Bemba people and beer was brewed often during harvest months.

Like the Bemba, the Chewa people also eat a porridge, called nsima, which is eaten with vegetables and used as a scoop.

The Tonga people of the region have traditionally eaten insects which are cooked or dried.

See also 

 Sylvia Banda

References

Citations

Sources

External links 
 http://www.zambia-travel-guide.com/bradt_guide.asp?bradt=1149
 https://www.britannica.com/place/Zambia

 
Zambia
Cuisine